Max Holmes (born 29 August 2002) is an Australian rules footballer who plays for Geelong in the Australian Football League (AFL).

Geelong traded their future first round pick with Richmond to secure Pick 20 in the 2020 AFL draft to select Holmes. Holmes made his AFL debut in round 3 of the 2021 AFL season against Hawthorn in the traditional Easter Monday clash. Holmes' mother is former Olympian Lee Naylor.

Statistics 
Updated to the end of the 2022 season.

|-
| 2021 ||  || 9
| 12 || 1 || 7 || 54 || 64 || 118 || 24 || 32 || 0.1 || 0.6 || 4.5 || 5.3 || 9.8 || 2 || 2.7 || 0
|-
| 2022 ||  || 9
| 18 || 13 || 6 || 161 || 119 || 280 || 68 || 42 || 0.7 || 0.3 || 8.9 || 6.6 || 15.6 || 3.8 || 2.3 || 2
|- class=sortbottom
! colspan=3 | Career
! 30 !! 14 !! 13 !! 215 !! 183 !! 398 !! 92 !! 74 !! 0.5 !! 0.4 !! 7.2 !! 6.1 !! 13.3 !! 3.1 !! 2.5 !! 2
|}

Honours and achievements
Team
 McClelland Trophy: 2022

Individual
 Geelong F.C. Best Young Player Award: 2021

References

External links 

2002 births
Living people
Australian rules footballers from Victoria (Australia)
Geelong Football Club players
Sandringham Dragons players
People educated at Melbourne Grammar School